Julia Flavia or Flavia Julia and also nicknamed Julia Titi ( – 91) was the daughter of Roman Emperor Titus and his first wife Arrecina Tertulla.

Biography

Early life
Julia was born in Rome to Titus and Arrecina Tertulla, she was named for Tertulla's mother Julia Ursa. Her mother was either divorced or died when Julia was an infant. Her father later remarried to Marcia Furnilla with whom he had another daughter who is presumed to have died young. In 65, after the failure of the Pisonian conspiracy, the family of Furnilla was disfavored by Nero. Julia's father, Titus concluded that he did not want to be connected with any potential plotters and ended his marriage to Julia's step-mother. Julia was likely raised by her maternal grandmother and the wet nurse Phyllis (who had already reared Julia's uncle Domitian as a child).

Marriage
When growing up, Titus offered her in marriage to his brother Domitian, but he refused because of his infatuation with Domitia Longina. Later she married her second paternal cousin Titus Flavius Sabinus, brother to consul Titus Flavius Clemens, who married her first cousin Flavia Domitilla.

Later life
After the death of her husband Julia lived in the palace with her uncle and his wife Domitia Longina.

Ancient historians report stories that Julia was seduced by her uncle and died having an abortion forced upon her by him, for example Dio claimed that he "lived with [her] as husband with wife, making little effort at concealment. Then upon the demands of the people he became reconciled with Domitia, but continued his relations with Julia nonetheless." and Juvenal stated "such a man was that adulterer [i.e. Domitian] who, after lately defiling himself by a union of the tragic style, revived the stern laws that were to be a terror to all men – ay, even to Mars and Venus – just as Julia was relieving her fertile womb and giving birth to abortions that displayed the likeness of her uncle." but modern historians generally regard this as slander against the emperor and the stories were likely invented after his assassination. Julia was deified after her death and Martial wrote a poem where in he praised her and wished for her to become the spiritual guardian of the (hoped for) future son of Domitian and Domitia whom he wished to be named "Julius" in her honor. Following the downfall of her uncle their wet nurse Phyllis mixed his ashes with those of Julia to ensure that his remains would not be thrown away.

Flavian family tree

Notes

References

Sources
Suetonius, The Twelve Caesars – Titus & Domitian 17, 22.
Dio Cassius, lxvii. 3.
Pliny, Ep. iv. 11. § 6. 
Philostratus, Vit. Apoll. Tyan. vii. 3.

External links

63 births
91 deaths
Flavian dynasty
Julia
1st-century Roman women
Deified Roman women
Titus
Daughters of Roman emperors